Fibromyalgia (FM) is a medical condition defined by the presence of chronic widespread pain, fatigue, waking unrefreshed, cognitive symptoms, lower abdominal pain or cramps, and depression. Other symptoms include insomnia and a general hypersensitivity.

The cause of fibromyalgia is unknown, but is believed to involve a combination of genetic and environmental factors. Environmental factors may include psychological stress, trauma, and certain infections. The pain appears to result from processes in the central nervous system and the condition is referred to as a "central sensitization syndrome".

The treatment of fibromyalgia is symptomatic and multidisciplinary. The European Alliance of Associations for Rheumatology strongly recommends aerobic and strengthening exercise. Weak recommendations are given to mindfulness, psychotherapy, acupuncture, hydrotherapy, and meditative exercise such as qigong, yoga, and tai chi. The use of medication in the treatment of fibromyalgia is debated, although antidepressants can improve quality of life. The medications duloxetine, milnacipran, or pregabalin have been approved by the US Food and Drug Administration (FDA) for the management of fibromyalgia. Other common helpful medications include serotonin-noradrenaline reuptake inhibitors (SNRI), non-steroidal anti-inflammatory drugs (NSAIDs), and muscle relaxants. Q10 coenzyme and vitamin D supplements may reduce pain and improve quality of life. While fibromyalgia is persistent in nearly all patients, it does not result in death or tissue damage.

Fibromyalgia is estimated to affect 2–4% of the population. Women are affected about twice as often as men. Rates appear similar in different areas of the world and among different cultures. Fibromyalgia was first defined in 1990, with updated criteria in 2011, 2016, and 2019. The term "fibromyalgia" is from New Latin fibro-, meaning "fibrous tissues", Greek μυο- myo-, "muscle", and Greek άλγος algos, "pain"; thus, the term literally means "muscle and fibrous connective tissue pain".

Classification
Fibromyalgia is classed as a disorder of pain processing due to abnormalities in how pain signals are processed in the central nervous system. The International Classification of Diseases (ICD-11) includes fibromyalgia in the category of "Chronic widespread pain", code MG30.01.

Signs and symptoms
The defining symptoms of fibromyalgia are chronic widespread pain, fatigue, and sleep disturbance. Other symptoms may include heightened pain in response to tactile pressure (allodynia), cognitive problems, musculoskeletal stiffness, environmental sensitivity, hypervigilance, sexual dysfunction, and visual symptoms.

Pain 
Fibromyalgia is predominantly a chronic pain disorder. According to the NHS, widespread pain is one major symptom, which could feel like: an ache, a burning sensation, or a sharp, stabbing pain.

Fatigue 
Fatigue is one of the defining symptoms of fibromyalgia. Patients may experience physical or mental fatigue. Physical fatigue can be demonstrated by a feeling of exhaustion after exercise or by a limitation in daily activities.

Sleep problems 
Sleep problems are a core symptom in fibromyalgia. These include a difficulty to fall asleep or stay asleep, awakening while sleeping and waking up feeling unrefreshed. A meta-analysis compared objective and subjective sleep metrics in people with fibromyalgia and healthy people. Individuals with fibromyalgia had lower sleep quality and efficiency, as well as longer wake time after sleep start, shorter sleep duration, lighter sleep, and greater trouble initiating sleep when objectively assessed, and more difficulty initiating sleep when subjectively assessed. Sleep problems may contribute to pain by decreased release of IGF-1 and human growth hormone, leading to decreased tissue repair. Improving sleep quality can help people with fibromyalgia minimize pain.

Cognitive problems 
Many people with fibromyalgia experience cognitive problems (known as "fibrofog" or "brainfog"). One study found that approximately 50% of fibromyalgia patients had subjective cognitive dysfunction and that it was associated with higher levels of pain and other fibromyalgia symptoms. The American Pain Society recognizes these problems as a major feature of fibromyalgia, characterized by trouble concentrating, forgetfulness and disorganized or slow thinking. About 75% of fibromyalgia patients report significant problems with concentration, memory, and multitasking. A 2018 meta-analysis found that the largest differences between fibromyalgia patients and healthy subjects were for inhibitory control, memory, and processing speed. It is hypothesized that the increased pain compromises attention systems, resulting in cognitive problems.

Hypersensitivity 
In addition to a hypersensitivity to pain, patients with fibromyalgia show hypersensitivity to other stimuli, such as bright lights, loud noises, perfumes and cold. A review article found that they have a lower cold pain threshold. Other studies documented an acoustic hypersensitivity.

Comorbidity 
Fibromyalgia as a stand-alone diagnosis is uncommon, as most fibromyalgia patients often have other chronic overlapping pain problems or mental disorders. Fibromyalgia is associated with mental health issues like anxiety, posttraumatic stress disorder, bipolar disorder, alexithymia, and depression. Patients with fibromyalgia are five times more likely to have major depression than the general population.

Fibromyalgia and numerous chronic pain conditions frequently coexist. These include chronic tension headaches, myofascial pain syndrome, and temporomandibular disorders. Multiple sclerosis, post-polio syndrome, neuropathic pain, and Parkinson's disease are four neurological disorders that have been linked to pain or fibromyalgia. Fibromyalgia largely overlaps with chronic fatigue syndrome and may share the same pathogenetic mechanisms.

Comorbid fibromyalgia has been reported to occur in 20–30% of individuals with rheumatic diseases. It has been reported in people with noninflammatory musculoskeletal diseases.

The prevalence of fibromyalgia in gastrointestinal disease has been described mostly for celiac disease and irritable bowel syndrome (IBS). IBS and fibromyalgia share similar pathogenic mechanisms, involving immune system mast cells, inflammatory biomarkers, hormones, and neurotransmitters such as serotonin. Changes in the gut biome alter serotonin levels, leading to autonomic nervous system hyperstimulation.

Fibromyalgia has also been linked with obesity. Other conditions that are associated with fibromyalgia include connective tissue disorders, cardiovascular autonomic abnormalities, and an overactive bladder.

Risk factors
The cause of fibromyalgia is unknown. However, several risk factors, genetic and environmental, have been identified.

Genetics

Genetics play a major role in fibromyalgia, and may explain up to 50% of the disease susceptibility. Fibromyalgia is potentially associated with polymorphisms of genes in the serotoninergic, dopaminergic and catecholaminergic systems. Several genes have been suggested as candidates for susceptibility to fibromyalgia. These include SLC6A4, TRPV2, MYT1L, NRXN3, and the 5-HT2A receptor 102T/C polymorphism. The heritability of fibromyalgia is estimated to be higher in patients younger than 50.

Neuropathic pain and major depressive disorder often co-occur with fibromyalgia – the reason for this comorbidity appears to be due to shared genetic abnormalities, which leads to impairments in monoaminergic, glutamatergic, neurotrophic, opioid and proinflammatory cytokine signaling. In these vulnerable individuals, psychological stress or illness can cause abnormalities in inflammatory and stress pathways that regulate mood and pain. Eventually, a sensitization and kindling effect occurs in certain neurons leading to the establishment of fibromyalgia and sometimes a mood disorder.

Stress 

Stress may be an important precipitating factor in the development of fibromyalgia. A 2021 meta-analysis found psychological trauma to be strongly associated with fibromyalgia. People who suffered abuse in their lifetime were three times more likely to have fibromyalgia, people who suffered medical trauma or other stressors in their lifetime were about twice as likely.

Some authors have proposed that, because exposure to stressful conditions can alter the function of the hypothalamic-pituitary-adrenal (HPA) axis, the development of fibromyalgia may stem from stress-induced disruption of the HPA axis.

Personality 
Although some have suggested that fibromyalgia patients are more likely to have specific personality traits, when depression is statistically controlled for, it appears that their personality is no different than that of people in the general population.

Other risk markers 
Other risk markers for fibromyalgia include premature birth, female sex, cognitive influences, primary pain disorders, multiregional pain, infectious illness, hypermobility of joints, iron deficiency and small-fiber polyneuropathy. Metal-induced allergic inflammation has also been linked with fibromyalgia, especially in response to nickel but also inorganic mercury, cadmium, and lead.

Pathophysiology
As of 2022, the pathophysiology of fibromyalgia has not yet been elucidated and several theories have been suggested.

Nervous system

Pain processing abnormalities 
Chronic pain can be divided into three categories. Nociceptive pain is pain caused by inflammation or damage to tissues. Neuropathic pain is pain caused by nerve damage. Nociplastic pain (or central sensitization) is less understood and is the common explanation of the pain experienced in fibromyalgia. Because the three forms of pain can overlap, fibromyalgia patients may experience nociceptive (e.g., rheumatic illnesses) and neuropathic (e.g., small fiber neuropathy) pain, in addition to nociplastic pain.

Nociplastic pain (central sensitization) 
Fibromyalgia can be viewed as a condition of nociplastic pain. Nociplastic pain is caused by an altered function of pain-related sensory pathways in the periphery and the central nervous system, resulting in hypersensitivity.

Nociplastic pain is commonly referred to as "Nociplastic pain syndrome" because it is coupled with other symptoms. These include fatigue, sleep disturbance, cognitive disturbance, hypersensitivity to environmental stimuli, anxiety, and depression. Nociplastic pain is caused by either (1) increased processing of pain stimuli or (2) decreased suppression of pain stimuli at several levels in the nervous system, or both.

Neuropathic pain 
An alternative hypothesis to nociplastic pain views fibromyalgia as a stress-related dysautonomia with neuropathic pain features. This view highlights the role of autonomic and peripheral nociceptive nervous systems in the generation of widespread pain, fatigue, and insomnia. The description of small fiber neuropathy in a subgroup of fibromyalgia patients supports the disease neuropathic-autonomic underpinning. However, others claim that small fiber neuropathy occurs only in small groups of those with fibromyalgia.

Autonomic nervous system 
Some suggest that fibromyalgia is caused or maintained by a decreased vagal tone, which is indicated by low levels of heart rate variability, signaling a heightened sympathetic response. Accordingly, several studies show that clinical improvement is associated with an increase in heart rate variability. Some examples of interventions that increase the heart rate variability and vagal tone are meditation, yoga, mindfulness and exercise. In 2023 the Fibromyalgia: Imbalance of Threat and Soothing Systems (FITSS) model was suggested as a working hypothesis. According to the FITSS model, the salience network (also known as the midcingulo-insular network) may remain continuously hyperactive due to an imbalance in emotion regulation, which is reflected by an overactive "threat" system and an underactive "soothing" system. This hyperactivation, along with other mechanisms, may contribute to fibromyalgia.

Neurotransmitters 
Some neurochemical abnormalities that occur in fibromyalgia also regulate mood, sleep, and energy, thus explaining why mood, sleep, and fatigue problems are commonly co-morbid with fibromyalgia. Serotonin is the most widely studied neurotransmitter in fibromyalgia. It is hypothesized that an imbalance in the serotoninergic system may lead to the development of fibromyalgia. There is also some data that suggests altered dopaminergic and noradrenergic signaling in fibromyalgia. Supporting the monoamine related theories is the efficacy of monoaminergic antidepressants in fibromyalgia.

Neurophysiology 
Neuroimaging studies have observed decreased grey matter of the default mode network in people with fibromyalgia. These deficits are associated with pain processing.

Neuroendocrine system 
Studies on the neuroendocrine system and HPA axis in fibromyalgia have been inconsistent. One study found fibromyalgia patients exhibited higher plasma cortisol, more extreme peaks and troughs, and higher rates of dexamethasone non-suppression. However, other studies have only found correlations between a higher cortisol awakening response and pain, and not any other abnormalities in cortisol. Increased baseline ACTH and increase in response to stress have been observed, hypothesized to be a result of decreased negative feedback.

Immune system 
Inflammation has been suggested to have a role in the pathogenesis of fibromyalgia. People with fibromyalgia tend to have higher levels of inflammatory cytokines IL-6, and IL-8. There are also increased levels of the pro-inflammatory cytokines IL-1 receptor antagonist. Increased levels of pro-inflammatory cytokines may increase sensitivity to pain, and contribute to mood problems. Anti-inflammatory interleukins such as IL-10 have also been associated with fibromyalgia.

A repeated observation shows that autoimmunity triggers such as traumas and infections are among the most frequent events preceding the onset of fibromyalgia. Neurogenic inflammation has been proposed as a contributing factor to fibromyalgia.

Digestive system

Gut microbiome 
Though there is a lack of evidence in this area, it is hypothesized that gut bacteria may play a role in fibromyalgia. People with fibromyalgia are more likely to show dysbiosis, a decrease in microbiota diversity. There is a bidirectional interplay between the gut and the nervous system. Therefore, the gut can affect the nervous system, but the nervous system can also affect the gut. Neurological effects mediated via the autonomic nervous system as well as the hypothalamic pituitary adrenal axis are directed to intestinal functional effector cells, which in turn are under the influence of the gut microbiota.

Gut-brain axis 
The gut-brain axis, which connects the gut microbiome to the brain via the enteric nervous system, is another area of research. Fibromyalgia patients have less varied gut flora and altered serum metabolome levels of glutamate and serine, implying abnormalities in neurotransmitter metabolism.

Diagnosis 

There is no single pathological feature, laboratory finding, or biomarker that can diagnose fibromyalgia and there is debate over what should be considered diagnostic criteria and whether an objective diagnosis is possible. In most cases, people with fibromyalgia symptoms may have laboratory test results that appear normal and many of their symptoms may mimic those of other rheumatic conditions such as arthritis or osteoporosis. The specific diagnostic criteria for fibromyalgia have evolved over time.

American College of Rheumatology 1990 
The first widely accepted set of classification criteria for research purposes was elaborated in 1990 by the Multicenter Criteria Committee of the American College of Rheumatology. These criteria, which are known informally as "the ACR 1990", defined fibromyalgia according to the presence of the following criteria:
 A history of widespread pain lasting more than three months – affecting all four quadrants of the body, i.e., both sides, and above and below the waist.
 Tender points – there are 18 designated possible tender points (although a person with the disorder may feel pain in other areas as well).

The ACR criteria for the classification of patients were originally established as inclusion criteria for research purposes and were not intended for clinical diagnosis but have later become the de facto diagnostic criteria in the clinical setting. A controversial study was done by a legal team looking to prove their client's disability based primarily on tender points and their widespread presence in non-litigious communities prompted the lead author of the ACR criteria to question now the useful validity of tender points in diagnosis. Use of control points has been used to cast doubt on whether a person has fibromyalgia, and to claim the person is malingering.

American College of Rheumatology 2010 provisional criteria 

In 2010, the American College of Rheumatology approved provisional revised diagnostic criteria for fibromyalgia that eliminated the 1990 criteria's reliance on tender point testing. The revised criteria used a widespread pain index (WPI) and symptom severity scale (SSS) in place of tender point testing under the 1990 criteria. The WPI counts up to 19 general body areas in which the person has experienced pain in the preceding week. The SSS rates the severity of the person's fatigue, unrefreshed waking, cognitive symptoms, and general somatic symptoms, each on a scale from 0 to 3, for a composite score ranging from 0 to 12. The revised criteria for diagnosis were:
 WPI ≥ 7 and SSS ≥ 5 OR WPI 3–6 and SSS ≥ 9,
 Symptoms have been present at a similar level for at least three months, and
 No other diagnosable disorder otherwise explains the pain.

American College of Rheumatology 2016 revisions 
In 2016, the provisional criteria of the American College of Rheumatology from 2010 were revised. The new diagnosis required all of the following criteria:

 "Generalized pain, defined as pain in at least 4 of 5 regions, is present."
 "Symptoms have been present at a similar level for at least 3 months."
 "Widespread pain index (WPI) ≥ 7 and symptom severity scale (SSS) score ≥ 5 OR WPI of 4–6 and SSS score ≥ 9."
 "A diagnosis of fibromyalgia is valid irrespective of other diagnoses. A diagnosis of fibromyalgia does not exclude the presence of other clinically important illnesses."

American Pain Society 2019 
In 2019, the American Pain Society in collaboration with the U.S. Food and Drug Administration developed a new diagnostic system using two dimensions. The first dimension included core diagnostic criteria and the second included common features. In accordance to the 2016 diagnosis guidelines, the presence of another medical condition or pain disorder does not rule out the diagnosis of fibromyalgia. Nonetheless, other conditions should be ruled out as the main explaining reason for the patient's symptoms. The core diagnostic criteria are:

 Multisite pain defined as six or more pain sites from a total of nine possible sites, for at least three months
 Moderate to severe sleep problems or fatigue, for at least three months
Common features found in fibromyalgia patients can assist the diagnosis process. These are tenderness (sensitivity to light pressure), dyscognition (difficulty to think), musculoskeletal stiffness, and environmental sensitivity or hypervigilance.

Self-report questionnaires 
Some research has suggested using a multidimensional approach taking into consideration somatic symptoms, psychological factors, psychosocial stressors and subjective belief regarding fibromyalgia. These symptoms can be assessed by several self-report questionnaires.

Widespread Pain Index (WPI) 
The Widespread Pain Index (WPI) measures the number of painful body regions.

Symptom Severity Scale (SSS) 
The Symptom Severity Scale (SSS) assesses the severity of the fibromyalgia symptoms.

Fibromyalgia Impact Questionnaire (FIQ) 
The Fibromyalgia Impact Questionnaire (FIQ) and the Revised Fibromyalgia Impact Questionnaire (FIQR) assess three domains: function, overall impact and symptoms. It is considered a useful measure of disease impact.

Other questionnaires 
Other measures include the Hospital Anxiety and Depression Scale, Multiple Ability Self-Report Questionnaire, Multidimensional Fatigue Inventory, and Medical Outcomes Study Sleep Scale.

Differential diagnosis
As of 2009, as many as two out of every three people who are told that they have fibromyalgia by a rheumatologist may have some other medical condition instead. Fibromyalgia could be misdiagnosed in cases of early undiagnosed rheumatic diseases such as preclinical rheumatoid arthritis, early stages of inflammatory spondyloarthritis, polymyalgia rheumatica, myofascial pain syndromes and hypermobility syndrome. Neurological diseases with an important pain component include multiple sclerosis, Parkinson's disease and peripheral neuropathy. Other medical illnesses that should be ruled out are endocrine disease or metabolic disorder (hypothyroidism, hyperparathyroidism, acromegaly, vitamin D deficiency), gastro-intestinal disease (celiac and non-celiac gluten sensitivity), infectious diseases (Lyme disease, hepatitis C and immunodeficiency disease) and the early stages of a malignancy such as multiple myeloma, metastatic cancer and leukemia/lymphoma. Other systemic, inflammatory, endocrine, rheumatic, infectious, and neurologic disorders may cause fibromyalgia-like symptoms, such as systemic lupus erythematosus, Sjögren syndrome, ankylosing spondylitis, Ehlers-Danlos syndromes, psoriatic-related polyenthesitis, a nerve compression syndrome (such as carpal tunnel syndrome), and myasthenia gravis. In addition, several medications can also evoke pain (statins, aromatose inhibitors, biophosphonates, and opioids).

The differential diagnosis is made during the evaluation on the basis of the person's medical history, physical examination, and laboratory investigations. The patient's history can provide some hints to a fibromyalgia diagnosis. A family history of early chronic pain, a childhood history of pain, an emergence of broad pain following physical and/or psychosocial stress, a general hypersensitivity to touch, smell, noise, taste, hypervigilance, and various somatic symptoms (gastrointestinal, urology, gynecology, neurology), are all examples of these signals 

Extensive laboratory tests are usually unnecessary in the differential diagnosis of fibromyalgia. Common tests that are conducted include complete blood count, comprehensive metabolic panel, erythrocyte sedimentation rate, C-reactive protein, and thyroid function test.

Management
As with many other medically unexplained syndromes, there is no universally accepted treatment or cure for fibromyalgia, and treatment typically consists of symptom management and improving patient quality of life. A personalized, multidisciplinary approach to treatment that includes both non-pharmacologic and pharmacologic therapy and begins with effective patient education is most beneficial. Developments in the understanding of the pathophysiology of the disorder have led to improvements in treatment, which include prescription medication, behavioral intervention, and exercise.

A number of associations have published guidelines for the diagnosis and management of fibromyalgia. The European League Against Rheumatism (EULAR; 2017) recommends a multidisciplinary approach, allowing a quick diagnosis and patient education. The recommended initial management should be non-pharmacological, later pharmacological treatment can be added. The European League Against Rheumatism gave the strongest recommendation for aerobic and strengthening exercise. Weak recommendations were given to a number of treatments, based on their outcomes. Qigong, yoga, and tai chi were weakly recommended for improving sleep and quality of life. Mindfulness was weakly recommended for improving pain and quality of life. Acupuncture and hydrotherapy were weakly recommended for improving pain. A weak recommendation was also given to psychotherapy. It was more suitable for patients with mood disorders or unhelpful coping strategies. Chiropractic was strongly recommended against, due to safety concerns. Some medications were weakly recommended for severe pain (duloxetine, pregabalin, tramadol) or sleep disturbance (amitriptyline, cyclobenzaprine, pregabalin). Others were not recommended due to a lack of efficacy (nonsteroidal anti-inflammatory drugs, monoamine oxidase inhibitors and selective serotonin reuptake inhibitors). Growth hormone, sodium oxybate, opioids and steroids were strongly recommended against due to lack of efficacy and side effects.

The guidelines published by the Association of the Scientific Medical Societies in Germany inform patients that self-management strategies are an important component in managing the disease. The Canadian Pain Society also published guidelines for the diagnosis and management of fibromyalgia.

Exercise 
Exercise is the only fibromyalgia treatment which has been given a strong recommendation by the European Alliance of Associations for Rheumatology (EULAR). There is strong evidence indicating that exercise improves fitness, sleep and quality of life and may reduce pain and fatigue for people with fibromyalgia. Exercise has an added benefit in that it does not cause any serious adverse effects.

Exercise may diminish fibromyalgia symptoms through a number of hypothesized biological mechanisms. Exercise may improve pain modulation through serotoninergic pathways. It may reduce pain by altering the hypothalamic-pituitary-adrenal axis and reducing cortisol levels. It also has anti-inflammatory effects that may improve fibromyalgia symptoms. Aerobic exercise can improve muscle metabolism and pain through mitochondrial pathways.

When comparing different exercise programs, aerobic exercise is capable of modulating the autonomic nervous function of fibromyalgia patients, whereas resistance exercise does not show such effects. A 2022 meta-analysis found that aerobic training showed a high effect size while strength interventions showed moderate effects. Meditative exercise seems preferable for improving sleep, with no differences between resistance, flexibility and aquatic exercise in their favorable effects on fatigue.

Despite its benefits, exercise is a challenge for patients with fibromyalgia, due to the chronic fatigue and pain they experience. They perceive it as more effortful than healthy adults. Exercise may intimidate them, in fear that they will be asked to do more than they are capable of. They may also feel that those who recommend or deliver exercise interventions do not fully understand the possible negative impact of exercise on fatigue and pain. This is especially true for non-personalized exercise programs. Adherence is higher when the exercise program is recommended by doctors or supervised by nurses. Depression and higher pain intensity serve as  barriers to physical activity. A recommended approach to a graded exercise program begins with small, frequent exercise periods and builds up from there. In order to reduce pain, it is recommended to use an exercise program of 13 to 24 weeks, with each session lasting 30 to 60 minutes.

Aerobic 
Aerobic exercise for fibromyalgia patients is the most investigated type of exercise. It includes activities such as walking, jogging, spinning, cycling, dancing and exercising in water, with walking being named as one of the best methods. A 2017 cochrane summary concluded that aerobic exercise probably improves quality of life, slightly decreases pain and improves physical function and makes no difference in fatigue and stiffness. A 2019 meta-analysis showed that exercising aerobically can reduce autonomic dysfunction and increase heart rate variability. This happens when patients exercise at least twice a week, for 45–60 minutes at about 60%-80% of the maximum heart rate. Aerobic exercise also decreases anxiety and depression and improves the quality of life.

Flexibility 
Combinations of different exercises such as flexibility and aerobic training may improve stiffness. However, the evidence is of low-quality. It is not clear if flexibility training alone compared to aerobic training is effective at reducing symptoms or has any adverse effects.

Resistance 
In resistance exercise, participants apply a load to their body using weights, elastic band, body weight or other measures.

Two meta-analyses on fibromyalgia have shown that resistance training can reduce anxiety and depression and one found that it improves quality of life.

The dosage of resistance exercise for women with fibromyalgia was studied in a 2022 meta-analysis. Effective dosages were found when exercising twice a week, for at least eight weeks. Symptom improvement was found for even low dosages such as 1–2 sets of 4–20 repetitions. Most studies use moderate exercise intensity of 40% to 85% one-repetition maximum. This level of intensity was effective in reducing pain. Some treatment regimes increase the intensity over time (from 40% to 80%), whereas others increase it when the participant is able to perform 12 repetitions. High-intensity exercises may cause lower treatment adherence.

Meditative 
A 2021 meta-analysis found that meditative exercise programs (tai chi, yoga, qigong) were superior to other forms of exercise (aerobic, flexibility, resistance) in improving sleep quality. Other meta-analyses also found positive effects of tai chi for sleep, fibromyalgia symptoms, and pain, fatigue, depression and quality of life. These tai chi interventions frequently included 1-hour sessions practiced 1-3 times a week for 12 weeks. Meditative exercises, as a whole, may achieve desired outcomes through biological mechanisms such as antioxidation, anti-inflammation, reduction in sympathetic activity and modulation of glucocorticoid receptor sensitivity.

Aquatic 
Several reviews and meta-analyses suggest that aquatic training can improve symptoms and wellness in people with fibromyalgia. It is recommended to practice aquatic therapy at least twice a week using a low to moderate intensity.

Other 
Limited evidence suggests vibration training in combination with exercise may improve pain, fatigue, and stiffness.

Medications 
A few countries have published guidelines for the management and treatment of fibromyalgia. As of 2018, all of them emphasize that medications are not required. However, medications, though imperfect, continue to be a component of treatment strategy for fibromyalgia patients. The German guidelines outlined parameters for drug therapy termination and recommended considering drug holidays after six months.

Approved medications 
Health Canada and the US Food and Drug Administration (FDA) have approved pregabalin and duloxetine for the management of fibromyalgia. The FDA also approved milnacipran, but the European Medicines Agency refused marketing authority.

Antidepressants
Antidepressants are one of the common drugs for fibromyalgia. A 2021 meta-analysis concluded that antidepressants can improve the quality of life for fibromyalgia patients in the medium-term. As of 2018, the only tricyclic antidepressant (TCA) that has sufficient evidence is amitriptyline.

For most people with fibromyalgia, the potential benefits of treatment with the serotonin and noradrenaline reuptake inhibitors (SNRI) duloxetine and milnacipran and the TCAs, such as amitriptyline, are outweighed by significant adverse effects (more adverse effects than benefits), however, a small number of people may experience relief from symptoms with these medications. In addition, while amitriptyline has been used as a first line treatment, the quality of evidence to support this use and comparison between different medications is poor. Very weak evidence indicates that a very small number of people may benefit from treatment with the tetracyclic antidepressant mirtazapine, however, for most, the potential benefits are not great and the risk of adverse effects and potential harm outweighs any potential for benefit.

The length of time that antidepressant medications take to be effective at reducing symptoms can vary. Any potential benefits from the antidepressant amitriptyline may take up to three months to take effect and it may take between three and six months for duloxetine, milnacipran, and pregabalin to be effective at improving symptoms. Some medications have the potential to cause withdrawal symptoms when stopping so gradual discontinuation may be warranted particularly for antidepressants and pregabalin.

There is tentative evidence that the benefits and harms of selective serotonin reuptake inhibitors (SSRIs) appear to be similar. SSRIs may be used to treat depression in people diagnosed with fibromyalgia.

Tentative evidence suggests that monoamine oxidase inhibitors (MAOIs) such as pirlindole and moclobemide are moderately effective for reducing pain. Very low-quality evidence suggests pirlindole as more effective at treating pain than moclobemide. Side effects of MAOIs may include nausea and vomiting.

Central nervous system depressants
Central nervous system depressants include drug categories such as sedatives, tranquilizers, and hypnotics. A 2021 meta-analysis concluded that such drugs can improve the quality of life for fibromyalgia patients in the medium-term.

Anti-seizure medication
The anti-convulsant medications gabapentin and pregabalin may be used to reduce pain. There is tentative evidence that gabapentin may be of benefit for pain in about 18% of people with fibromyalgia. It is not possible to predict who will benefit, and a short trial may be recommended to test the effectiveness of this type of medication. Approximately 6/10 people who take gabapentin to treat pain related to fibromyalgia experience unpleasant side effects such as dizziness, abnormal walking, or swelling from fluid accumulation. Pregabalin demonstrates a benefit in about 9% of people. Pregabalin reduced time off work by 0.2 days per week.

Cannabinoids 
Cannabinoids may have some benefits for people with fibromyalgia. However, as of 2022, the data on the topic is still limited. Cannabinoids may also have adverse effects and may negatively interact with common rheumatological drugs.

Opioids
The use of opioids is controversial. As of 2015, no opioid is approved for use in this condition by the FDA. A 2016 Cochrane review concluded that there is no good evidence to support or refute the suggestion that oxycodone, alone or in combination with naloxone, reduces pain in fibromyalgia. The National Institute of Arthritis and Musculoskeletal and Skin Diseases (NIAMS) in 2014 stated that there was a lack of evidence for opioids for most people. The Association of the Scientific Medical Societies in Germany in 2012 made no recommendation either for or against the use of weak opioids because of the limited amount of scientific research addressing their use in the treatment of FM. They strongly advise against using strong opioids. The Canadian Pain Society in 2012 said that opioids, starting with a weak opioid like tramadol, can be tried but only for people with moderate to severe pain that is not well-controlled by non-opioid painkillers. They discourage the use of strong opioids and only recommend using them while they continue to provide improved pain and functioning. Healthcare providers should monitor people on opioids for ongoing effectiveness, side effects, and possible unwanted drug behaviors.

A 2015 review found fair evidence to support tramadol use if other medications do not work. A 2018 review found little evidence to support the combination of paracetamol (acetaminophen) and tramadol over a single medication. Goldenberg et al suggest that tramadol works via its serotonin and norepinephrine reuptake inhibition, rather than via its action as a weak opioid receptor agonist.

A large study of US people with fibromyalgia found that between 2005 and 2007 37.4% were prescribed short-acting opioids and 8.3% were prescribed long-acting opioids, with around 10% of those prescribed short-acting opioids using tramadol; and a 2011 Canadian study of 457 people with FM found 32% used opioids and two-thirds of those used strong opioids.

Topical treatment 
Capsaicin has been suggested as a topical pain reliever. Preliminary results suggest that it may improve sleep quality and fatigue, but there are not enough studies to support this claim.

Unapproved or unfounded
Sodium oxybate increases growth hormone production levels through increased slow-wave sleep patterns. However, this medication was not approved by the FDA for the indication for use in people with fibromyalgia due to the concern for abuse.

The muscle relaxants cyclobenzaprine, carisoprodol with acetaminophen and caffeine, and tizanidine are sometimes used to treat fibromyalgia; however, as of 2015 they are not approved for this use in the United States. The use of NSAIDs is not recommended as first line therapy. Moreover, NSAIDs cannot be considered as useful in the management of fibromyalgia.

Very low-quality evidence suggests quetiapine may be effective in fibromyalgia.

No high-quality evidence exists that suggests synthetic THC (nabilone) helps with fibromyalgia.

Nutrition and dietary supplements
Nutrition is related to fibromyalgia in several ways. Some nutritional risk factors for fibromyalgia complications are obesity, nutritional deficiencies, food allergies and consuming food additives. The consumption of fruits and vegetables, low-processed foods, high-quality proteins, and healthy fats may have some benefits. Low-quality evidence found some benefits of a vegetarian or vegan diet.

Although dietary supplements have been widely investigated in relation to fibromyalgia, most of the evidence, as of 2021, is of poor quality. It is therefore difficult to reach conclusive recommendations. It appears that Q10 coenzyme and vitamin D supplements can improve pain and quality of life for fibromyalgia patients. Q10 coenzyme has beneficial effects on fatigue in fibromyalgia patients, with most studies using doses of 300 mg per day for three months. Q10 coenzyme is hypothesized to improve mitochondrial activity and decrease inflammation. Vitamin D has been shown to improve some fibromyalgia measures, but not others.

A review article including four studies with 98 patients found that melatonin treatment has several positive effects on fibromyalgia patients, including the improvement of sleep quality, pain, and disease impact. No major adverse events were reported.

Psychotherapy
Due to the uncertainty about the pathogenesis of FM, current treatment approaches focus on management of symptoms to improve quality of life, using integrated pharmacological and non-pharmacological approaches. There is no single intervention shown to be effective for all patients. In a 2020 Cochrane review cognitive behavioral therapy (CBT) was found to have a small but beneficial effect for reducing pain and distress but adverse events were not well evaluated. CBT and related psychological and behavioural therapies have a small to moderate effect in reducing symptoms of fibromyalgia. Effect sizes tend to be small when CBT is used as a stand-alone treatment for FM patients, but these improve significantly when CBT is part of a wider multidisciplinary treatment program.

A 2010 systematic review of 14 studies reported that CBT improves self-efficacy or coping with pain and reduces the number of physician visits at post-treatment, but has no significant effect on pain, fatigue, sleep, or health-related quality of life at post-treatment or follow-up. Depressed mood was also improved but this could not be distinguished from some risks of bias. A 2022 meta-analysis found that CBT reduces insomnia in people with chronic pain, including people with fibromyalgia. Sleep hygiene interventions, however, were not as effective.

Patient education 
Patient education is recommended by the European League Against Rheumatism (EULAR) as an important treatment component. As of 2022, there is only low-quality evidence showing that patient education can decrease pain and fibromyalgia impact.

Sleep hygiene interventions show low effectiveness in improving insomnia.

Manual therapy 
A 2021 meta-analysis concluded that massage and myofascial release diminish pain in the medium-term. As of 2015, there was no good evidence for the benefit of other mind-body therapies.

Acupuncture
A 2013 review found moderate-level evidence on the usage of acupuncture with electrical stimulation for improvement of the overall well-being. Acupuncture alone will not have the same effects, but will enhance the influence of exercise and medication in pain and stiffness.

Electrical neuromodulation 
Several forms of electrical neuromodulation, including transcutaneous electrical nerve stimulation (TENS) and transcranial direct current stimulation (tDCS), have been used to treat fibromyalgia. In general, they have been found to be helpful in reducing pain and depression and improving functioning.

Transcutaneous electrical nerve stimulation (TENS) 
Transcutaneous electrical nerve stimulation (TENS) is the delivery of pulsed electrical currents to the skin to stimulate peripheral nerves. TENS is widely used to treat pain and is considered to be a low-cost, safe, and self-administered treatment. As such, it is commonly recommended by clinicians to people suffering from pain. On 2019, an overview of eight Cochrane reviews was conducted, covering 51 TENS-related randomized controlled trials. The review concluded that the quality of the available evidence was insufficient to make any recommendations. A later review concluded that transcutaneous electrical nerve stimulation may diminish pain in the short-term, but there was uncertainty about the relevance of the results.

Preliminary findings suggest that electrically stimulating the vagus nerve through an implanted device can potentially reduce fibromyalgia symptoms. However, there may be adverse reactions to the procedure.

Noninvasive brain stimulation 
Noninvasive brain stimulation includes methods such as transcranial direct current stimulation and high-frequency repetitive transcranial magnetic stimulation (TMS). Both methods have been found to improve pain scores in neuropathic pain and fibromyalgia.

A 2023 meta analysis of 16 RCTs found that transcranial direct current stimulation (tDCS) of over 4 weeks can decrease pain in patients with fibromyalgia.

A 2021 meta-analysis of multiple intervention types concluded that magnetic field therapy and transcranial magnetic stimulation may diminish pain in the short-term, but conveyed an uncertainty about the relevance of the result. Several 2022 meta-analyses focusing on transcranial magnetic stimulation found positive effects on fibromyalgia. Repetitive transcranial magnetic stimulation improved pain in the short-term and quality of life after 5–12 weeks. Repetitive transcranial magnetic stimulation did not improve anxiety, depression, and fatigue. Transcranial magnetic stimulation to the left dorsolateral prefrontal cortex was also ineffective.

Hyperbaric oxygen therapy 
Hyperbaric oxygen therapy (HBOT) has shown beneficial effects in treating chronic pain. However, treating fibromyalgia with hyperbaric oxygen therapy is still controversial, in light of the scarcity of large-scale clinical trials. In addition, hyperbaric oxygen therapy raises safety concerns due to the oxidative damage that may follow it. An evaluation of nine trials with 288 patients in total found that HBOT was more effective at relieving fibromyalgia patients' pain than the control intervention. In most of the trials HBOT improved sleep disturbance, multidimensional function, patient satisfaction, and tender spots. Unfortunately, 24% of the patients experienced negative outcomes.

Prognosis
Although in itself fibromyalgia is neither degenerative nor fatal, the chronic pain of fibromyalgia is pervasive and persistent. Most people with fibromyalgia report that their symptoms do not improve over time. However, most patients learn to adapt to the symptoms over time. The German guidelines for patients explain that:

 The symptoms of fibromyalgia are persistent in nearly all patients.
 Total relief of symptoms is seldom achieved.
 The symptoms do not lead to disablement and do not shorten life expectancy.

An 11-year follow-up study on 1,555 patients found that most remained with high levels of self-reported symptoms and distress. However, there was a great deal of patient heterogeneity accounting for almost half of the variance. At the final observation, 10% of the patients showed substantial improvement with minimal symptoms. An additional 15% had moderate improvement. This state, though, may be transient, given the fluctuations in symptom severity.

A study of 97 adolescents diagnosed with fibromyalgia followed them for eight years. After eight years, the majority of youth still experienced pain and disability in physical, social, and psychological areas. At the last follow-up, all participants reported experiencing one or more fibromyalgia symptoms such pain, fatigue, and/or sleep problems, with 58% matching the complete ACR 2010 criteria for fibromyalgia. Based on the WPI and SS score cut-points, the remaining 42% exhibited subclinical symptoms. Pain and emotional symptom trajectories, on the other hand, displayed a variety of longitudinal patterns. The study concluded that while most patient's fibromyalgia symptoms endure, the severity of their pain tends to reduce over time.

Baseline depressive symptoms in adolescents appear to predict worse pain at follow-up periods.

Epidemiology
Fibromyalgia is estimated to affect 2–4% of the population.

Females are affected about twice as often as males based on criteria as of 2014.

History
Chronic widespread pain had already been described in the literature in the 19th century but the term fibromyalgia was not used until 1976 when Dr P.K. Hench used it to describe these symptoms. Many names, including "muscular rheumatism", "fibrositis", "psychogenic rheumatism", and "neurasthenia" were applied historically to symptoms resembling those of fibromyalgia. The term fibromyalgia was coined by researcher Mohammed Yunus as a synonym for fibrositis and was first used in a scientific publication in 1981. Fibromyalgia is from the Latin fibra (fiber) and the Greek words myo (muscle) and algos (pain).

Historical perspectives on the development of the fibromyalgia concept note the "central importance" of a 1977 paper by Smythe and Moldofsky on fibrositis. The first clinical, controlled study of the characteristics of fibromyalgia syndrome was published in 1981, providing support for symptom associations. In 1984, an interconnection between fibromyalgia syndrome and other similar conditions was proposed, and in 1986, trials of the first proposed medications for fibromyalgia were published.

A 1987 article in the Journal of the American Medical Association used the term "fibromyalgia syndrome" while saying it was a "controversial condition". The American College of Rheumatology (ACR) published its first classification criteria for fibromyalgia in 1990. Later revisions were made in 2010, 2016, and 2019.

Society and culture

Economics
People with fibromyalgia generally have higher healthcare costs and utilization rates. A review of 36 studies found that fibromyalgia causes a significant economic burden on health care systems. Annual costs per patient were estimated to be up to $35,920 in the US and $8,504 in Europe.

Controversies
Fibromyalgia was defined relatively recently. In the past, it was a disputed diagnosis. Frederick Wolfe, lead author of the 1990 paper that first defined the diagnostic guidelines for fibromyalgia, stated in 2008 that he believed it "clearly" not to be a disease but instead a physical response to depression and stress. In 2013, Wolfe added that its causes "are controversial in a sense" and "there are many factors that produce these symptoms – some are psychological and some are physical and it does exist on a continuum". Some members of the medical community did not consider fibromyalgia a disease because of a lack of abnormalities on physical examination and the absence of objective diagnostic tests.

In the past, some psychiatrists have viewed fibromyalgia as a type of affective disorder, or a somatic symptom disorder. These controversies do not engage healthcare specialists alone; some patients object to fibromyalgia being described in purely somatic terms.

As of 2022, neurologists and pain specialists tend to view fibromyalgia as a pathology due to dysfunction of muscles and connective tissue as well as functional abnormalities in the central nervous system. Rheumatologists define the syndrome in the context of "central sensitization" – heightened brain response to normal stimuli in the absence of disorders of the muscles, joints, or connective tissues. Because of this symptomatic overlap, some researchers have proposed that fibromyalgia and other analogous syndromes be classified together as central sensitivity syndromes.

Notes

References

External links 
 Arthritis – Types – Fibromyalgia by the CDC
 Fibromyalgia by the National Institute of Arthritis and Musculoskeletal and Skin Diseases
 Fibromyalgia by the American College of Rheumatology
 Fibromyalgia by the NHS

Ailments of unknown cause
Chronic pain syndromes
Rheumatology
Wikipedia medicine articles ready to translate
Wikipedia neurology articles ready to translate
1981 neologisms